The NAU Lumberjacks football program is the intercollegiate American football team for the Northern Arizona University located in Flagstaff, Arizona. The team competes in the NCAA Division I Football Championship Subdivision (FCS) and is a member of the Big Sky Conference. The school's first football team was fielded in 1915. The team plays its home games at the 17,500 seat Walkup Skydome. Chris Ball has been the head coach since the 2019 season.

History

The Lumberjacks have maintained numerous rivalries with their western counterparts. Competition has not only been limited to the west. The Lumberjacks have also taken on eastern programs such as the Ole Miss Rebels, Florida Atlantic Owls, and the Appalachian State Mountaineers.

On September 18, 2021, Northern Arizona beat Arizona for the first time since 1932, winning 21–19. It was their first win against a FBS team since beating UTEP in 2018 and their third overall win against an FBS team since 2012. It is also the first time they beat a member of the Pac-12 Conference.

Classifications
 1937–1952: NCAA College Division
 1953–1968: NAIA
 1969–1972: NCAA College Division
 1973–1977: NCAA Division II
 1978–present: NCAA Division I–AA/FCS

Conference affiliations
 Independent (1915–1930, 1963–1969)
 Border Conference (1931–1952)
 New Mexico Conference / Frontier Conference (1953–1962)
 Big Sky Conference (1970–present)

Championships

Conference championships

Postseason results

NAIA

NCAA Division II playoffs

 NAU was runner-up in Big Sky to champion Boise State, which had a scheduling conflict.

NCAA Division I-AA/FCS playoffs
The Lumberjacks have appeared in the NCAA I-AA/FCS playoffs six times, with an overall record of 1–6.

Rivalries

Southern Utah

Northern Arizona leads Southern Utah 16–10 in the series through the 2021 fall season.

Current coaching staff

Notable former players
Notable alumni include:
 John Bonds
 Shawn Collins
 Michael Haynes
 Michael Mendoza
 Rex Mirich, first Lumberjack football player to be inducted into the College Football Hall of Fame
 Keith O'Neil
 Khalil Paden
 Speedy Duncan: Played six years professional football in the American Football League (AFL).
 Travis Brown: Played for the Seattle Seahawks and Buffalo Bills from 2000 to 2003.
 Willard Reaves: Played pro football in the Canadian Football League and the National Football League.  In the CFL he played for the Winnipeg Blue Bombers, where his team won the 1984 Grey Cup and, in the same season, Reaves won the Most Outstanding Player Award.  He also played for the Washington Redskins and Miami Dolphins in the NFL.
 Tom Jurich, former athletic director at the University of Louisville
 Archie Amerson
 Pete Mandley
 Allan Clark
 Derek Mason – college football coach
 Case Cookus

References

External links
 

 
American football teams established in 1915
1915 establishments in Arizona